Smętowo Graniczne  is a village in Starogard County, Pomeranian Voivodeship, in northern Poland. It is the seat of the gmina (administrative district) called Gmina Smętowo Graniczne.

For details of the history of the region, see History of Pomerania.

The village has a population of 3,000.

Notable residents
 Kurt Feldt (1887–1970), General

References

Villages in Starogard County